Shabdan (former Novorossiyka) is a village in the Kemin District of Chüy Region of Kyrgyzstan. The village is located on the right bank of the river Chong-Kemin. Its population was 2,157 in 2021.

References

Populated places in Chüy Region